Divorce in Pakistan is mainly regulated under the Dissolution of Muslim Marriage Act 1939 amended in 1961 and the Family Courts Act 1964. Similar to global trends divorce rate is increasing gradually in Pakistan too. In Punjab (Pakistan), in 2014 khula cases registered were 16,942 that rose to 18,901 cases in 2016.

In 2019 in Karachi 11,143 cases filed, 2020 first quarter 3,800 cases filed, one and half year preceding to June 2020 cases filed were 14,943; out of which 4,752 disposed of effecting 2,000 women divorced in 2019 affecting 2100 children.

According to Aizbah Khan of Bol news, Pakistan's prime minister Imran Khan holds popularity of Hollywood and Bollywood films to be responsible for increase in divorce rate in Pakistan.

Legal provisions and issues 
According to Pakistani conservative Islamic scholarship provision of giving written notice to spouse for divorce is incompatible with Islamic laws and practices and they pressure the government to revoke such provisions. Section 10 (4) of the Family Courts Act, October 2005 provides for divorce procedure.

For the Hindus, the divorce was legalized in Sindh in 2018 when Sindh Hindu marriage act was amended to add divorce and remarriage rights for Hindu couples.

Reason for divorce 
Prolonged illness, infertility, disability, chronic illness, and mental health issues are some of the reasons for divorces along with western influence, decreasing trust and tolerance vis a vis the joint family system, unemployment, and financial stress, decreasing religious value education too are some of the reasons for an increase in the divorce rate in Pakistan. A culture of strong joint family connections in Pakistan can lead to interference from joint of family members that intensify marital discord. Azher and Hafiza study on smaller sample size attribute reasons to in-laws interference, lack of mutual understanding, financial exploitation, and torturous environment.

Domestic Violence and its prevalence 
Intimate partner violence, also known as domestic violence, is a major cause for the breakup of marriages in Pakistan.

US and western influence 
Shazia Ramzan and Saira Akhtar ascribe multinational job opportunities and study scholarships for Pakistani women as reasons for the increase in the divorce rate in Pakistan; Murtaza Haider questions such anti-western theories, pointing out that few women have access to overseas study. Haider suggests to stopping domestic violence against wives will reduce divorce in Pakistan.

Extra marital relationships 
Pakistani spouses consider extra marital affairs as unforgettable and unforgivable act which leads to divorce situations

Sexual Dysfunction 
As per Khan, Sikander, Akhlaq while some women complained of their respective spouses being impotent or gay.

Difficulties in availing remedies 

Mohsina Munir and Tahira AbdulQuddus did a study of 500 female petitioners and found that these petitioners usually faced problems on account of very long suits, very costly expenses, insufficient awareness of legal provisions and lack of ease of legal support, insufferable false accusations, bribery, nepotism, unjust action taken on legal requirements and fake witnesses.

Effects 
As per to ‘Global Gender Gap Index 2018’, Pakistan scored 148 of 149 countries in terms of gender parity across four areas: education, health, economic opportunity, and political empowerment, that means women in Pakistan substantially miss on emotional and financial support and makes them helpless in marital discord situations. Still women are stigmatized even if cause and decision of divorce is not her mistake. Children of separated parents have to struggle more to find his life partner in Pakistan

Health 
Women suffer insomnia, depression, anxiety, and panic attacks whereas men suffer psychologically for the longingness of their children. Distrust and loneliness are faced equally by both.

Divorce compensation 
According to Sulema Jahangir due to politically influential conservative mindset spread by Islamist clergy in south Asia many Muslim women bear with abusive marriages to avoid risk of finding themselves on the street. It is not western influences or women behavior responsible for increasing divorce rate in Pakistan but cost of breaking up marriage to Pakistani male is minimal. Maintenance awarded to children is minimal, and even after giving lifetime service to her family, women don't get share in income or assets of their parting husband. Sulema Jahangir says modern International standards and Convention on the Elimination of all Forms of Discrimination Against Women expect divorce proceedings to count women’s non-financial contributions to a marriage. Many other Muslim countries from Indonesia to Turkey are moving forwards in incorporating suitable legislations improving financial compensation to divorcee wives as mata’a (compensation of kindness) or haq meher (rightful mandatory compensation) through Nikah nama sharing husbands income and assets to better much levels (30 to 50% of assets while departing) also taking into account their non-financial contributions to the family, but Pakistan is lagging behind in social emancipation of divorcing wives.

In literature, drama and media 
A placard slogan “Divorced and happy!” at Aurat March (an International women's day march held since 2018) which intended to challenge social stigmatization, negative perception and discrimination of divorcee women conducive for continuation of abusive marriages came in public discourse on social media, also in mainstream media. 2019 Pakistani TV drama named Meray Paas Tum Ho encompassing debate surrounding marital relationships getting estranged with foregrounding of romantic extramarital relationship, caught Pakistani national attention. Referring to placard slogan “Divorced and happy!” Dawn images column says that Pakistani children are made to witness depressed, loveless, toxic marriages, while men too are responsible for divorces only women are held responsible and stigmatized, while as per the Human Rights Commission of Pakistan, percentage of married women have experienced sexual abuse, particularly domestic rape is up to 47%.

See also 
 Marriage in Pakistan
 Divorce in India
 Hindu marriage laws in Pakistan
Divorce in Islam
Women in Pakistan
Women related laws in Pakistan

References 

Pakistan
Society of Pakistan
Marriage in Pakistan